Shahini (also Romanized as Shāhīnī) is a village in Baladarband Rural District, in the Central District of Kermanshah County, Kermanshah Province, Iran. At the 2006 census, its population was 344, in 73 families.

References 

Populated places in Kermanshah County